The following is an alphabetical list of characters (and their performers) from the SABC 2 soap opera 7de Laan, sorted by character first/given name.

Past characters (actors/actresses)

A
 Altus de Bruyn (Heino Schmidt)
 Alyce Khumalo (Vuyelwa Booi)
 André Vosloo (Marcus Muller)
 Anna van Biljon (Hanli Rolfes)
 Annelie van Dyk (Donnalee Roberts)
 Antoinette Heyneke (Zoe Ras)
 Asha Sharma (Kajal Bagwandeen)
 Aubrey (Randall de Jager)
Augusta Visagie (Hannelie Warren)
 Ava Jordaan (Emily McLaren)

B
 Bart Kruger (Neil Sandilands)
 Ben van Staden (Louis Auret)
 Bernard Jordaan (Werner Coetser)
 Brandt van der Bergh (Steve Hofmeyr)
 Brionay (Verona Gosslet)

C
 Carlos Perestrelo (Pedro Camara)
 Cas van Graan (Andre Roothman)
 Charmaine Meintjies (Vinette Ebrahim)
 Christelle Terreblanche (Anna-Mart van der Merwe)
 Cindy (Christina Storm)
 Clara Vasilesko (Angelique Gerber)
 Connie Vosloo (Quinne Brown Huffman)

D
 Daleen Meintjies (Denise Newman)
 Daniel Meintjies (Kynan Lottering)
 Danelle (Andrea Streso)
 Dawid Greef (Stian Bam)
 Derin (Eugene Wanangwa Khumbanyiwa)
 Dewald Gerické (Kaz McFadden)
 Dezi Terreblanche (Elma Postma)
 Diederik Greyling (Hennie Jacobs)
 Dorothy Daniels (Shaleen Surtie-Richards)
 Dr SP de Wet Malan (Gys de Villiers)
 Dwayne (David Johnson)
 Dylan (Charl Timotheus)

E
 Elna Bredenkamp (Mandi Baard)
 Elsa Winterbach (Isadora Verwey)
 Emma le Roux (Bertha le Roux-Wahl)
 Errol Pieterse (Christo Davids)
 Esther (Trudie Taljaard)
 Esti Fouché (Reandi Grey)

F
 Felicity Croukamp (Melanie Du Bois)
 Fikani Chauke (Nicholas Nkuna)
 "Flooze van Witbank" (Sorina Erasmus)
 Francois "Krokodil" Rossouw (Chris Van Niekerk)

G
 Gabby Kemp (Blyde Smit)
 George Kyriakis (Nico Panagio)
 Gita McGregor (Jo da Silva)

H
 Hannes (Izak Taljaard)
 Helena Moolman (Jana Strydom)
 Henk (Francois Jacobs)
 Herman Croukamp (Deon Coetzee)
 Hilda Kruger (Annelisa Weiland)

I
 Inge van Schalkwyk (Antoinette Louw)
 Isabelle Moolman (Illse Roos)

J
 Jacob Moloi (Patrick Shai)
 Jacomien van Niekerk (Susanne Beyers)
 Jan-Hendrik Terreblanche (Waldemar Schultz)
 Jason De Lange (Jaco Snyman)
 Jerome (Terence Bridgett)
 Jocelyn Pieterse (Keziah Jooste)
 Johan (Reynard Slabbert)
 Justin Booysen (Dann-Jaques Mouton)

K
 Kabelo Padi (Sekoati Tsubane)
 Karien Momberg (Christi Panagio)
 Khethiwe Mtathi (Sesethu Ntombela)
 Kim Conradie (Corné Crous)
 Kopano Sithole (Thabo Mhlanga)

L
 Lana Welman (Mila Guy) 
 Lanie (Natalie van der Walt) 
 Leon de Lange (Dawid Minnaar)
 Lerato (Soso Rungqu)
 Liam (Chris Chameleon)
 Liezl (Anel Alexander)
 Linda Jordaan (Elsabé Daneel)
 Lindile Hadebe (Musa Ngema)
 Llewellyn Paulsen (Liaan Ferreira) 
 Louis Spies (Leslie van Wyk)
 Lukas Mulder (Hendrik Cronje)

M
 Madel Terreblanche (Wilna Snyman)
 Mandla Khumalo (Freedom Hadebe)
 Marcel van Niekerk (Zetske van Pletzen)
 Maria Zibula (Themsie Times)
 Matrone Netta Nortjé (Annelize van der Ryst)
 Monique van Huyssteen (Minette Grové)

N
 Nadine (Mmapule Tsholo)
 Nadia Croukamp (Simoné Nortmann)
 Neville Meintjies (Zane Meas)
 Nthabiseng (Salamina Mosese)
 Neef Gert (Ben Kruger)
 Nikki Basson (Danielle Retief)
 Nila (Gulashafa Sayed)

O
 Ockert (Anrich Herbst)
 Olivia Greyling (Nadia Herbst)
 Oubaas Septimus van Zyl (Pierre van Pletzen)

P
 Paula van der Lecq-de Bruyn (Diaan Lawrenson)
 Petra Terreblanche (Yvonne van den Bergh)
 Petro Cilliers (Carla van der Merwe)
 Pierre (Brian Robson)
 Pieter van Heerden (Ivan Botha)
 Pulane Masemola (Masego Sehoole)

Q
 Quentin (Danny Ross)

R
 Retha (Marlise Erwee)
 Rhulani Chauke (Sabelo Radebe)
 Rickus Welman (André Lötter)
 Riaan van Dyk (Luan Jacobs)
 Romeo Peterson (Clint Aplon)
 Romi (Barbara-Marie Venter)
 Ryno Lategan (Chris Vorster)

S
 Sandra Theron-Stutterheim (Heléne Lombard)
 Sanjay Ramdin (Strini Pillai)
 San-Mari van Graan (Amalia Uys)
 Shawn Basson (Deànré Reiners)
 Sheldon (Denver Vraagom)
 Sifiso Ndlela (Anelisa Phewa)
Dr Sindisiwe van Zyl (as herself)
 Sonja Theunissen (Tessa Holloway)
 Steyn (Ivan Zimmerman)

T
 Tamara (Tess van Staden)
 Tante Dolores (Marga van Rooy)
 Tannie Rademan (Miems De Bruyn)
 Tannie Schoeman (Milla Louw)
 Terry de Klerk (Jenna Dunster) 
 Tessa Krige (Vicky Davis)
 Tiaan Terreblanche (Francois Rautenbach)
 Tim Jordaan (Marius Weyers)
 Tokkie le Roux (Richard van der Westhuizen)
 Trishan (Jai'prakash Sewram)
 Tshepo (Sam Mbuyane)
 Tyrone "Ty" Prinsloo (Wilhelm van der Walt)

U

V
 Vernon (Duane Williams)
 Vince Meintjies (Jacques Blignaut)

W
 Welile Nzuza (Dumi)
 Willem Rautenbach (Ray Randall)
 Willem Spies (Markus Haywood)
 Wilmien de Lange (Nina Swart)
 Wynand (Marcel Van Heerden)

X
 Xander Meintjies (Theodore Jantjies)

Y

Z
 Zinzi Kheswa (Caroline Jacobs)

Past recurring characters (guest actors)

A
 Alan Fletcher (Duncan Lawson)
 Alex (Donovan Honeyborne)
 Amos Ndaba (Boikie Pholo)
 Andries (Ian Rossouw)
 Anél Botha (Kara du Toit)
 Antoinette Heyneke (Zoe Ras)
 Arnold Langley (Simon Bruinders)

B
 Baby AJ de Bruyn (Jean Louw)
 Baby Daniel Meintjies (Riley Moses)
 Baby Karmen (Razeen Isaacs)
 Baby Samantha (Mia van Wyk)
 Bekker (Shaun Barnard)
 Benji (Rowan Cloete)
 Belinda (Maritsa)
 Bertus (Jean-Chris Posthumus)
 Bets (Gigi Strydom)
 Bianca Goosen (Sanli Jooste)
 Boeta (David James)
 Brummer (Abel Knobel)
 Byron Bromberg (Ruben Engel)

C
 Charlie (Yutamé Venter)
 Chanelle (Luandri Reynders)
 Chris-Jan "CJ" Tredoux (Jean-Pierre Lombard)
 Clinton Cilliers (Adolph de Beer)

D
 Daleen Meintjies (Denise Newman)
 Dali (Thabiso Mokethi)
 David Abrahams (Abduraghmaan Adams)
 Debbie (Jocelyn Broderick)
 Douglas Fletcher (Mike Huff)
 Dominee (Div de Villiers)
 Dr Kritzinger (Estelle Kriek Venter)
 Dr Moolman (Anriette van Rooyen)
 Duan (Zander de Vries)
 Dumisani (Sandile Makhoba)
 Dwelmsmous (Gert Steyn)

E
 Eben (Jacques Bessenger)
 Elaine Mostert (Natasha Dryden)
 Emile Lombard (Christopher van der Westhuizen)
 Erika Basson (Corine du Toit)
 Ethan Daniels (Miles Silkiewicz)
 Ettiene (David Louw)
 Eugenie (Mariska Venter)

F
 Fekile (Benni Langa)
 Frank Krige (Albert Maritz)
 Freda (Corlia Troskie)

G
 Gcobani Mthathi (Tony Kgoroge)
 Gerda (Mari Michael)

H
 Hector Sithole (Lutendo Mugeri)
 Henco Cilliers (Hugo Madeleyn)
 Hettie Bothma (Karin van der Laag)

I
 Irma Theunissen (Adriana Faling)

J
 Jackson (Marcus Mabusela)
 Janet (Ingeborg Riedmaier)
 Jacques Burger (Ruan Wessels)
 Joshi (Zane Gillion)
 Jurie (Herman Vorster)

K
 Kai Zinga/Kellan (Riaz Solker)
 Karmen (Erin le Roux)
 Kevin Ramsay (Ashish Gangapersad)
 Khanyi Ndaba (Hlehle Ndlovu)
 Koot (Francois Stemmet)
 Kosie (Kosie Schoeman)
 Kristin de Swardt (Loriska Bubb)
 Kyla Welman (Izel Bezuidenhout)

L
 Larry Saayman (Sean Brebnor)
 Leonie (Marinhta Labuschagne)
 Lianie Tredoux (Heidi Mollentze)
 Liezel (Liezl Geldenhuys)
 Lilian Bala (Vicky Kente)
 Llewellyn (Liaan Ferreira) 
 Lola (Gigi)
 Lorenzo (Tiaan Kelderman)
 Lorraine (Estelle Grobler - Stellie)
 Loyiso (Mike Mvelase)
 Luke (Jonathan Pienaar)
 Lynette Lindeque (Odelle de Wet)
 Lynn-Mari (Vanessa Smith)

M
 Marko Greyling (Francois Lensley)
 Mam'Nothemba (Thokozile Clementine Ntshinga)
 Michelle (Michelle Victor)
 Mieke Basson (Reze-Tiana Wessels)
 Mienkie Nel Kingsley (Marijke Bezuidenhout)
 Monika "Liefie" Visagie (Martelize Kolver)
 Monique (Lizca Kruger)
 Monique Adams (Leiden Colbet)

N
 Nadine (Mmapule Tsholo)
 Natalie Baker (Daniella Deysel)
 Nathan Alexander (Vaughn Lucas)
 Nurse (Zelda Roelofse)

O

P
 Priscilla (Tanja Franszen)
 Professor Jonathan Bailey (Mark Richardson)

Q

R
 Renier Dippenaar (Frederick Bezuidenhout)
 Retief (Alwyn van der Merwe)
 Rick (Darren Kelfkens)
 Rochelle (Lindy Joubert)
 Ruth (Tina Jaxa)

S
 Shanice Langley (Carla Classen)
 Speurder Kobus Fourie (Willem Klopper)
 Speurder Fritz de Lange (Jacques Gombault)
 Stephanus van Wyk (Peter Terry)
 Suna Bosman (Anelle Bester Ludik)

T
 Tarryn (Kay Smith)
 Theuns (Henré Pretorius)
 Thinus le Roux (Juandré van Zyl)
 Tineke (Trix Vivier)
 Tom (Craig Hawks) 
 Tommy (Krüger Swart)
 Tony (Marlo Minnaar)
 Tumi (Mari Molefe van Heerden)
 Tumi Selepe (Linda Sokhulu)

U
 Uncle Hugo (Tobie Cronje)

V
 Varinder Oberoi (Varen)
 Vanessa's GP (Natasha du Plooy)
 Vivian Williams (Vinette Ebrahim)

W
 Wessel Buys (André Schwartz)

X

Y
 Yannis (Emmanuel Castis)
 Young Amorey (Wanya Rees)

Z
 Zama Mabaso (Shadi Chauke)
 Zelda Kingsley (Amor Vittone)

See also

References

Lists of soap opera characters